The 2013–14 Bayer 04 Leverkusen season is the 110th season in the club's football history.

Background

Background information
In the 2012–13 season, Bayer Leverkusen finished in third place in the Bundesliga. As the third place team, they qualified for the group stage of Champions League. During the off-season Kostas Stafylidis, Robbie Kruse, Andrés Palop, Son Heung-min and Emre Can were signed. Daniel Schwaab, Hajime Hosogai, Michael Rensing, Dani Carvajal, André Schürrle, and Michal Kadlec were sold. Junior Fernándes was loaned out to Dinamo Zagreb. Nicolai Jørgensen made his loan move permanent and Manuel Friedrich was released. Sami Hyypiä became the sole head coach after Sascha Lewandowski left his position as co–head coach. Lewandowski remained with the club in the youth set-up. Bayer Leverkusen announced a three–year partnership agreement with the tourism agency with Austrian state of Salzburg. The agreement includes an annual summer training camp in Kaprun, at least one friendly against an "attractive opponent" during the training camp, vents in and around Leverkusen, public relations and promotional activities at the club and in North Rhine Westphalia, targeted hospitality measures at the stadium, International press conferences at the training camps, advertising at the BayArena perimeter advertising at Bayer Leverkusen home games, online presence on all relevant channels at Bayer Leverkusen, Salzburg articles in all Bayer 04 Leverkusen print media. Bayer Leverkusen started pre–season training on 24 June with eight players. Reserve and youth teams players came to training to improve the number situation for training. Bayer Leverkusen announced on 12 December that they signed Julian Brandt for the winter transfer period. The following day, Bayer Leverkusen announced that they brought in Ryu Seung-Woo on loan for a year with the option to purchase. Players reported back on 4 January and traveled to Lagos, Portugal for mid–season training camp and had their first training session on 5 January. Bayer Leverkusen are interested in Kevin De Bruyne and met with him and his representative on 16 December. But De Bruyne ended up signing with VfL Wolfsburg.

Transfers

In

Out

Bundesliga

Bayer Leverkusen started their Bundesliga campaign against SC Freiburg on 10 August. Bayer Leverkusen 3–1. Stefan Kießling, Son Heung-min, and Sidney Sam scored for Bayer Leverkusen. Mike Hanke scored for Freiburg. Bayer Leverkusen finished the matchday tied for third place in the table with Bayern Munich. Bayer Leverkusen went on to face VfB Stuttgart on matchday two on 17 August. Bayer Leverkusen won 1–0 with an own goal from Daniel Schwaab. Bayer Leverkusen were tied with Bayern Munich for second place in the table. Then Bayer Leverkusen faced Borussia Mönchengladbach on matchday three on 24 August. Bayer Leverkusen won 4–2. Bayer Leverkusen's goalscorers were Kießling, Sidney Sam (2 goals), and Gonzalo Castro. Martin Stranzl and Juan Arango scored for Borussia Mönchengladbach. Bayer Leverkusen finished the matchday 3 in second place. Bayer Leverkusen finished August with matchday four against Schalke 04 on 31 August. Schalke 04 won 2–0 with goals from Marco Höger and Jefferson Farfán. Bayer Leverkusen finished August tied for third place with Hannover 96. Bayer Leverkusen started September with matchday five against VfL Wolfsburg on 14 September. Bayer Leverkusen won 3–1. Sidney Sam and Kießling (2 goals) scored for Bayer Leverkusen and Ivica Olić scored for Wolfsburg. Bayer Leverkusen remained in third place. Bayer Leverkusen Mainz 05 on matchday six on 21 September. Bayer Leverkusen won 4–1. Bayer Leverkusen's goalscorers were Robbie Kruse (2 goals), Lars Bender, and Kießling.  Yunus Mallı scored for Mainz. Bayer Leverkusen remained in third place in the Bundesliga table. Bayer Leverkusen faced Hannover 96 on matchday seven on 28 September. Bayer Leverkusen won 2–0 with goals from Simon Rolfes and Sidney Sam. Bayer Leverkusen finished the matchday in fifth place. Bayern Munich on matchday eight on 5 October. The match ended in a 1–1 draw. Sidney Sam scored for Bayer Leverkusen and Toni Kroos scored for Bayern Munich. Bayer Leverkusen finished the matchday in third place. Bayer Leverkusen then faced 1899 Hoffenheim on matchday nine on 18 October. Bayer Leverkusen won 2–1. Sidney Sam and Kießling scored for Bayer Leverkusen. Kießling's goal went through the side netting on the left side. kicker magazine called the goal "Phantomtor". Stefan Kießling later apologized for the goal and understood why it was an illegitimate goal. Sven Schipplock scored for 1899 Hoffenheim. Bayer Leverkusen finished the matchday in third place. On 28 October, the German Football Association decided not to replay the match against 1899 Hoffenheim.  Hoffenheim decided not to appeal the decision. Bayer Leverkusen finished October against FC Augsburg on matchday 10 on 26 October. Bayer Leverkusen won 2–1. Simon Rolfes and Emre Can scored for Bayer Leverkusen. André Hahn scored for Augsburg. Bayer Leverkusen finished October in third place. Bayer Leverkusen started November with matchday 11 of the Bundesliga against Eintracht Braunschweig on 2 November. Eintracht Braunschweig won 1–0 with a goal from Dominick Kumbela. Bayer Leverkusen finished the matchday in third place. Bayer Leverkusen were against Hamburger SV on matchday 12 on 9 November. Bayer Leverkusen won 5–3. Son (3 goals), Kießling and Gonzalo Castro scored for Bayer Leverkusen. Maximilian Beister (2 goals) and Pierre-Michel Lasogga scored for Hamburg. Bayer Leverkusen finished the matchday in third place. Bayer Leverkusen's next opponents were Hertha BSC on matchday 13 on 23 November. Bayer Leverkusen won 1–0 with a goal from Kießling. Bayer Leverkusen finished the matchday in third place. Bayer Leverkusen finished November with matchday 14 against 1. FC Nürnberg on 30 November. Bayer Leverkusen won 3–0 with goals from Son and Kießling. Bayer Leverkusen finished November in third place. Bayer Leverkusen started December against Borussia Dortmund on matchday 15 on 7 December. Bayer Leverkusen won 1–0 with a goal from Son. Bayer Leverkusen moved up to second place in the table. Bayer Leverkusen faced Eintracht Frankfurt on matchday 16 on 15 December. Eintracht Frankfurt won 1–0 with a goal from Marco Russ. Bayer Leverkusen finished the matchday in second place. Bayer Leverkusen finished December against Werder Bremen on matchday 17 on 21 December. Werder Bremen won 1–0 with a goal from Santiago García. Bayer Leverkusen finished December in second place.

Bundesliga results

League table

League table by matchday

DFB–Pokal

The first round of the DFB-Pokal on 15 June. Bayer Leverkusen was drawn against Lippstadt 08. The match took place on 3 August. Bayer Leverkusen won 6–1. Lars Bender, Sidney Sam, Stefan Kießling (2 goals), and Son Heung-min (2 goals) scored for Bayer Leverkusen. Benjamin Kolodzig scored for Lippstadt 08. On 10 August, Bayer Leverkusen was drawn against Arminia Bielefeld for the second round. The match took place on 24 September. Bayer Leverkusen won 2–0 with goals from Son and Sam. On 29 September, Bayer Leverkusen were drawn against SC Freiburg in the draw for the round of 16. The match took place on 4 December. Bayer Leverkusen won 2–1. Robbie Kruse and Emre Can scored for Bayer Leverkusen and Matthias Ginter scored for Freiburg. The draw for the Quarter–finals happened on 8 December. The result was that Bayer Leverkusen would face 1. FC Kaiserslautern. The match was played on 12 February. Kaiserslautern won 1–0 with an extra time goal from Srđan Lakić. Andrés Guardado made his first appearance for Bayer Leverkusen in the match.

DFB-Pokal results

Champions League

In the 2012–13 season, Bayer Leverkusen finished in third place in the Bundesliga. As the third place team, they qualified for the group stage of Champions League. The draw for the Champions League Group Stage happened on 29 August. Bayer Leverkusen were drawn into Group A against Manchester United, Shakhtar Donetsk, and Real Sociedad. Bayer Leverkusen kicked off their Champions League campaign on 17 September against Manchester United. Manchester United won 4–2. Bayer Leverkusen's goalscorers were Simon Rolfes and Ömer Toprak. Manchester United goalscorers were Wayne Rooney, Robin van Persie, and Antonio Valencia. Wayne Rooney scored two goals and got his 200th goal for Manchester United in the match. Bayer Leverkusen finished matchday one in third place in the Group A table. Bayer Leverkusen faced Real Sociedad on matchday two on 2 October. Bayer Leverkusen won 2–1. Simon Rolfes and Jens Hegeler scored for Bayer Leverkusen. Carlos Vela scored for Real Sociedad. Bayer Leverkusen finished match day two in third place. Shakhtar Donetsk on 23 October. Bayer Leverkusen won 4–0 with goals from Stefan Kießling (2 goals), Simon Rolfes, and Sidney Sam. Shakhtar Donetsk on matchday four on 5 November. The match ended in a 0–0 draw. Bayer Leverkusen finished the matchday in second place. Bayer Leverkusen faced Manchester United on matchday five on 27 November. Manchester United won 5–0. Antonio Valencia, Emir Spahić (own goal), Jonny Evans, Chris Smalling, and Nani scored for Manchester United. Bayer Leverkusen finished the matchday in third place. The next game was vs Real Sociedad on 10 December. Bayer Leverkusen won 1–0 with a goal from Ömer Toprak. Bayer Leverkusen finished the matchday in second place and qualified for the round of 16. The draw for the round of 16 took place on 16 December. Bayer Leverkusen were drawn against Paris Saint-Germain. The first leg was played on 18 February. Paris Saint-Germain won 4–0 with goals from Blaise Matuidi, Zlatan Ibrahimović (2 goals), and Yohan Cabaye.

Group stage

Group results

Group table

Table by matchday

Knockout phase

Player information

Squad & statistics

Disciplinary record

Bookings

Kits

Notes
1.Kickoff time in Central European Time/Central European Summer Time.
2.Bayer Leverkusen goals first.

References

Bayer Leverkusen
Bayer 04 Leverkusen seasons
Bayer Leverkusen